It's the Big Joyous Celebration, Let's Stir the Honeypot is the second studio album by American rock band Teen Suicide. The album was released on April 1, 2016 on Run for Cover Records.

Although various outlets—including the band's label Run for Cover Records—have referred to It's the Big Joyous Celebration, Let's Stir the Honeypot as Teen Suicide's final album, the band themselves have indicated that they will not be disbanding but merely changing their band name "when our contract is up."

Critical reception

It's the Big Joyous Celebration, Let's Stir the Honeypot received largely positive reviews from contemporary music critics. At Metacritic, which assigns a normalized rating out of 100 to reviews from mainstream critics, the album received an average score of 79, based on 6 reviews, which indicates "generally favorable reviews".

David Sackllah of Spin praised the album, stating, "For a lo-fi project, Celebration is a particularly imaginative, lengthy work full of vivid character portraits, using additional instrumentation and computer-generated distortion to expand far beyond the boundaries of more straightforward guitar-driven indie acts."

Ian Cohen of Pitchfork Media gave the album a favorable review, stating, "The directness with which it speaks to its audience makes it easy to imagine Celebration inspiring a lot of its younger listeners to start a band. For anyone else, it’s just an inspiring testament to indie rock’s continued vitality."

Will Richards of DIY was more critical of the album, stating, "Teen Suicide’s final act is nigh-on impossible to categorise or fully digest, and its nature and length makes it at the same time a difficult listen, but one that brings rewards of all different kinds across its running length."

Track listing

Personnel
Teen Suicide
 Sam Ray – music, lyrics, recording (1, 2, 4-21, 23-26)
 John Toohey – additional guitar (3), additional vocals (2)
 Alec Simke – bass (3, 11, 12, 18), additional vocals (2)
 Sean Mercer – drums (1, 3, 22), recording (1, 3, 22), engineering (1, 3, 22), mixing (1, 3, 22), additional vocals (1, 2)

Additional personnel
 Eric Livingston – drums (12, 18)
 Dexter Tortoriello – additional instrumentation (9), additional production (9)
 Spencer Radcliffe – co-writing (24), additional keyboards (24), additional drums (24), additional lyrics (24), horns (24), additional vocals (2, 6, 13, 24)
 Delaney Mills – additional percussion (5)
 Max Kuzmyak – trumpet (1)
 Caroline White – additional vocals (2, 6, 12)
 David Courtright – additional vocals (2)
 Harmony Tividad – additional vocals (2, 4, 9, 13)
 Josephine Ray – additional vocals (2)
 Kinsey Matthews – additional vocals (2)
 Lexi Williams – additional vocals (6)
 Liz Sea – additional vocals (2)
 Madeline Ava – additional vocals (21)
 Neil Sanzgiri – additional vocals (2)
 Owen Pallett – additional vocals (2)

References

Teen Suicide (band) albums
2016 albums
Run for Cover Records albums